Mohan Singh Kothari is a Chartered Engineer born in Udaipur, Rajasthan, India on 7 December 1935 with schooling in Udaipur & higher education in Jaipur and The University of Texas, U.S.A (B.S.) and Louisiana State University, U.S.A.(M.S.) and finally with Government of India Management Training at the   Administrative Staff College of India, Hyderabad.

He is credited with technical development as a scientist & Head of the Engineering & Designs of National Institutions of the Council of Scientific & Industrial Research (CSIR), India- with achievements in process development, scale-up and design of industrial projects, of which several are of major impact, e.g.  production of morphine, codeine, ethylene oxide, bacterial diastase, tetra-bromo-indigo, design calculation for expansion of Koyali (Gujarat) Refinery, production of magnesium metal, production of the oil, pyrethrins, caffeine, and production of copper, lead, zinc concentrates out of complex ores.

Kothariji is a  Member or Fellow of the Institution of Engineers, India; American Institute of Chemical Engineers American Chemical Society; Mining Geological & Metallurgical Institute of India; Indian Institute of Mineral Engineers; General Council of Indian Standards Institution; International Advisory Board of Encyclopedia of Chemical Processing & Design (USA); Working Group of Appropriate Technologies constituted by the Planning Commission of India; Governing Committee of BINEDS Scheme of Bank of India.

He  held the positions of Director & General Manager: Sikkim Mining Corporation; Director Industrial & Technical Development, Government of Sikkim, Managing Director, State Trading Corporation of Sikkim; Chief Consultant, PICO, Punjab; Founder GM of Soybean Project (a World Bank Project) to organize 50,000 farmers to produce a new crop & set up its processing plant.

Mr. M. S. Kothari belongs to the first generation scientists of Independent India who laid the foundation of the scientific base of the new nation. The chemical processes mentioned in the page are yet in use by the grateful nation. Under Mr. Kothari stewardship the Sikkim Mining Corporation (1969) witnessed successful recovery of operations post 1968 Floods & Landslide disaster, the unit was visited by the appreciative Mr. Morarji Desai Deputy Prime Minister of India & King Palden Thondup Namgyal of Sikkim, along with Mr. R.N. Haldipur (PAO Sikkim), Mr. Kirti Desai and Mr. NB Menon, IFS, India Political Officer in Sikkim.

He is associated with a number of organizations in Udaipur  In the field of social service, M. S. Kothari is actively attached to: Ramakrishna Mission in its Chandigarh Ashram for a decade and as Founder-Trustee for life of Sri Ramakrishna-Vivekananda Sadhana Kendra Trust, Udaipur; With Seva Mandir as a Trustee (since 1983) & its President for the term 1994-1997; Chairman of the World Wide Fund for Nature (WWF) Udaipur Division Committee; Member of the Maharana Mewar Awards Selection Committee; Member of the Governing Council of Maharana Pratap Smarak Samiti, Udaipur; Member Maharana Mewar Public School Management Committee; Life Member of Vidya Bhawan Society, Udaipur; Life Member, Bhartiya Lok Kala Mandal; Founder Member Director of Rotary Club of Jorhat, Assam; Founder Member Director of Rotary Club of Sikkim, Gangtok.

Er. Kothari belongs to a renowned family that has produced administrators & army commander. He is fifteenth generation from Kothari Chohitji who was brought to Mewar by Maharana Kumbha (r: 1433-1468 CE) and appointed Prime Minister at Kumbhalgarh, his seventh ancestor Kothari Chaturbhuj ji was PM of Maharana Jagat Singh II (r:1734-1751) and later of Maharana Raj Singh II (r: 1754-1761). Kothari Kesri Singh was Prime Minister of Mewar during the reigns of Maharana Swaroop Singh (r: 1842-1861) and Maharana Shambhu Singh (r: 1861-1874) and his son Kothari Balwant Singh was PM for two decades during the reign of Maharana Fateh Singh (r: 1884-1930).

For his valuable contributions, Mohan Singh Kothari was awarded the highest honor conferred by the Department of Chemical Engineering of the University of Texas at Austin as Academy of Distinguished Chemical Engineers Honoree on September 14, 2018, at Austin, Texas, U.S.A. The honor was received on his behalf by his son Dilip Singh Kothari & daughter-in-law Puja Kothari.

References

Engineers from Rajasthan
1935 births
Living people
People from Udaipur
Indian chemical engineers